Saruta is a Japanese surname. Notable people with the surname include:

, Japanese footballer
, Japanese footballer
, Japanese mixed martial artist

See also
Saruta Dam, a dam in Niigata Prefecture, Japan

Japanese-language surnames